William Pratt (1872 – after 1898) was an English professional footballer who made 22 appearances in the Football Alliance playing for Small Heath.

Pratt, born in Highgate, Birmingham, joined Small Heath in 1889. A winger whose strengths were dribbling and crossing the ball but who lacked pace, he made his first-team debut on 19 October 1889, playing at inside left in a 2–2 draw away at The Wednesday in the Football Alliance. He became a first-team regular in the 1890–91 season, but lost his place to new arrival "Toddy" Hands in December 1890, played only twice more for the first team, and dropped back into local non-league football in 1892.

He is often confused with another Billy Pratt, a left back who did not join the club until 1894.

References

1872 births
Year of death missing
Footballers from Birmingham, West Midlands
English footballers
Association football forwards
Birmingham City F.C. players
Worcester City F.C. players
Date of birth missing
Place of death missing
Football Alliance players